"Loud" is a song co-written and recorded by Canadian country artist Tim Hicks. The track was produced by Todd Clark, who co-wrote the track with Hicks, Gavin Slate, and Travis Wood. The track was the lead single off Hicks' fourth studio album New Tattoo.

Background
Hicks told Top Country: "We had a riot writing and recording 'LOUD', and I think it shows on the track, it's high energy, guitar driven, and begs to be played live, so I can't wait to get out and perform it!"

Commercial performance
"Loud" was certified Gold by Music Canada on October 7, 2020, with over 40,000 sales. It reached a peak of #4 on the Billboard Canada Country chart dated July 28, 2018, marking Hicks' eleventh Top 10 hit.

In popular culture
"Loud" was licensed for use during the 2018 Stanley Cup playoffs on Sportsnet in Canada and NBC Sports in the United States. Team Canada chose "Loud" as their official goal song for the 2021 World Junior Ice Hockey Championships in Edmonton.

Music video
The official music video for "Loud" premiered on May 31, 2018 and was directed by Peter Zavadil.

Charts

Certifications

References

2018 songs
2018 singles
Tim Hicks songs
Open Road Recordings singles
Songs written by Tim Hicks
Songs written by Todd Clark
Songs written by Gavin Slate
Songs written by Travis Wood (songwriter)
Song recordings produced by Todd Clark